American country music singer Randy Houser has released six studio albums, sixteen singles, including one as a featured artist, and thirteen music videos.

Houser released his first album, Anything Goes, in 2008 through Universal South Records. It included the hit single, "Boots On", which reached number two on the Billboard Hot Country Songs chart. After a series of under-performing singles, Houser left the Show Dog-Universal Music label group and signed with Stoney Creek Records in 2011. His first album on that label, 2013's How Country Feels, generated four consecutive top-three singles on the country charts, including two number-ones. He released his fourth album, Fired Up, in 2016, which was led by the chart-topping single, "We Went".

Studio albums

Singles

Guest singles

Music videos

References

Country music discographies
Discographies of American artists